2023 in Misfits Boxing is the second year in the history of Misfits Boxing, a crossover boxing promotion founded by English YouTuber KSI and run by Mams Taylor, Kalle and Nisse Sauerland. Misfits Boxing will hold 10 events and have currently held 2 events in 2023.

MF & DAZN: X Series 004 

MF & DAZN: X Series 004 featured KSI vs FaZe Temperrr, billed as Uncaged, an exhibition crossover boxing match contested between British YouTuber KSI and Brazilian YouTuber FaZe Temperrrr. The bout took place on 14 January 2023 at Wembley Arena, in London, England. KSI defeated Temperrr via knockout in the 1st round.

MF & DAZN: X Series 005 

MF & DAZN: X Series 005 featured Jay Swingler vs NichLmao, an exhibition crossover boxing match contested between British YouTuber Jay Swingler and Singaporean YouTuber NichLmao. The bout took place on 4 March 2023 at the Telford International Centre in Telford, England. Swingler defeated NichLmao via majority decision.

Background

During the broadcast for MF & DAZN: X Series 004, it was announced that Jay Swingler would face NichLmao on 25 February 2023 in Milton Keynes, England. It was later announced that the event had been postponed to 4 March to the Telford International Centre in Telford, due to clashes with Jake Paul vs Tommy Fury on the same date.

The event introduced 'tag team boxing' to the sport of boxing. The teams consisted of Los Pineda Colads, which had Luis Alcaraz Pineda and BDave take on D-Generation Ice, which featured Anthony Vargas and Ice Poseidon. The rules stated that a boxer can tag-in their teammate once they get to their corner, scorecards are calculated based on the performance of the boxers in the ring as though both team members are one person and if an opponent gets knockout, then the opposing team will be crowned the winner. 

 Card

MF & DAZN: X Series 006 

MF & DAZN: X Series 006 features JMX vs. Le'Veon Bell, an upcoming professional crossover boxing match contested between British YouTuber JMX and American football running back Le'Veon Bell. The bout is scheduled for 21 April at the XULA Convocation Centre in New Orleans, Louisiana, US.

Background

During the broadcast for MF & DAZN: X Series 005, it was announced that JMX would face Le'Veon Bell on 21 April in New Orleans, Louisiana. Originally, it was announced that X Series 006 would take place on 22 April but was moved forward a day as that  date clashes with Gervonta Davis vs. Ryan Garcia.

Card

MF & DAZN: X Series 007 
MF & DAZN: X Series 007 is scheduled for 13 May at Wembley Arena, London, England. KSI is rumoured to headline against Joe Fournier.

MF & DAZN: X Series 008 
MF & DAZN: X Series 008 is scheduled for 10 June in Nashville, Tennessee, US.

MF & DAZN: X Series 009 
MF & DAZN: X Series 009 is scheduled for 22 July in Berlin, Germany.

MF & DAZN: X Series 010 
MF & DAZN: X Series 010 is scheduled for 26 August in London, England.

MF & DAZN: X Series 011 
MF & DAZN: X Series 011 is scheduled for 30 September in Ibiza, Spain.

MF & DAZN: X Series 012 
MF & DAZN: X Series 012 is scheduled for 4 November in Austin, Texas, US.

MF & DAZN: X Series 013 
MF & DAZN: X Series 013 is scheduled for 16 December in Cardiff, Wales. This is the targeted date for the highly anticipated match between KSI and Jake Paul

Notes

References

External links

2023 in boxing
Crossover boxing events
YouTube Boxing events
KSI